was a Japanese politician. He was governor of Saitama Prefecture (1916-1919), Nagano Prefecture (1921-1922) and Kumamoto Prefecture (1922-1923).

Awards
1945 - Order of the Sacred Treasure

References

|-

|-

|-

|-

Governors of Saitama Prefecture
Governors of Nagano
Governors of Kumamoto Prefecture
Recipients of the Order of the Sacred Treasure
1878 births
1958 deaths
Ministers of Health and Welfare of Japan